Jacob Larsen (born 12 January 1979) is a Danish cricketer. Larsen is a left-handed batsman who bowls right-arm medium pace. He was born at Egvad, Ringkøbing County.

Career
Larsen represented Denmark Under-19s in six One Day Internationals in 1998. A decade later, he made his full debut for Denmark at Svanholm Park, Brøndby, against the touring Marylebone Cricket Club. The following year he was selected in Denmark's squad for the World Cup Qualifier in South Africa, playing in a single List A match during the tournament against Oman. scoring 12 runs at number ten in Denmark's innings of 220, before he was dismissed by Hemal Mehta. With the ball, he bowled ten overs for 38 runs, taking the wicket of Hemin Desai. Denmark lost the match by 5 wickets.

In 2011, Larsen was selected as part of Denmark's squad for the 2011 ICC World Cricket League Division Three tournament in Hong Kong, making five appearances. In March 2012, Denmark took part in the World Twenty20 Qualifier in the United Arab Emirates, with Larsen selected in their fourteen man squad. Larsen made his Twenty20 debut during the tournament against the Netherlands at the ICC Global Cricket Academy. He made a further appearance during the competition against Oman. He scored 8 runs in his two matches, while with the ball he bowled just a single over.

Outside of playing the game, Larsen has worked for the Dansk Cricket Forbund as a youth development officer.

References

External links
Jacob Larsen at ESPNcricinfo
Jacob Larsen at CricketArchive

1979 births
Living people
People from Ringkøbing-Skjern Municipality
Danish cricketers
Sportspeople from the Central Denmark Region